Rodrigo Fabri (born 15 January 1976 in Santo André) is a Brazilian retired football player, who played as a midfielder or forward.

External links

1976 births
Living people
People from Santo André, São Paulo
Brazilian footballers
Brazilian people of Italian descent
Campeonato Brasileiro Série A players
Clube Atlético Mineiro players
CR Flamengo footballers
Grêmio Foot-Ball Porto Alegrense players
São Paulo FC players
Sporting CP footballers
La Liga players
Real Madrid CF players
Atlético Madrid footballers
Real Valladolid players
Associação Portuguesa de Desportos players
Paulista Futebol Clube players
Figueirense FC players
Esporte Clube Santo André players
Brazil international footballers
Association football midfielders
Footballers from São Paulo (state)